World Balance (WB or W) is a Filipino sports footwear and apparel brand that was established in 1980. A division of CHG Global, Inc., the brand is one of the Philippines' major sportswear manufacturers.

History

In 1980, Arsenio Chong, Armani Chong, and Sin Chong founded World Balance International Incorporated in their current location in Caloocan. In 2006, one of the brothers' sons, Barnaby Chong, took over as the president and CEO while other family members took up key positions within the company.

In 2018, the business entity was renamed from World Balance International, Inc. to CHG Global, Inc. reflecting the diversification of the parent company to its other brands and services.

In 2020, the company announced that it was converting some of its manufacturing facilities to produce face masks in response to the COVID-19 pandemic; this has been expanded to include a line of protective apparel.

Products

World Balance manufactures a range of shoes and apparel. Its performance and athlesiure shoes include its Bounce pad and Terrasoft lines, named for the type of foam in their soles.

The company manufactures lifestyle sneakers worn for fashion, including Disney, Star Wars, Secret Fresh, and Smiley World lines.

World Balance manufactures a line of everyday apparel including snap button shirt-jackets, windbreakers, long-sleeved shirts and track pants, as well as hoodies, sweaters and sweatpants.

Sponsorships
The company provides licensed merchandise of the Philippine Basketball Association (PBA), and is the official sponsor of PBA team Barangay Ginebra San Miguel. Scottie Thompson is a brand ambassador.

World Balance entered sponsorship in the Binibining Pilipinas franchise that determines future candidates for international pageants such as Miss Universe and Miss International. The brand sponsored some of the footwear used by the candidates.

References

External links

 

 
1980 establishments in the Philippines
1980s fashion
1990s fashion
2000s fashion
2010s fashion
Philippine companies established in 1980
Athletic shoe brands
Clothing companies established in 1980
Philippine brands
Shoe brands
Shoe companies of the Philippines
Sporting goods manufacturers of the Philippines
Sportswear brands
Companies based in Caloocan